Spiderling may refer to:

 an immature spider
 the herbaceous plant genus Boerhavia